This article presents a list of the historical events and publications of Australian literature during 1995.

Events 

 Helen Demidenko won the Miles Franklin Award for The Hand That Signed the Paper

Major publications

Novels 

 Bryce Courtenay, The Potato Factory
 Beverley Farmer, The House in the Light
 Rod Jones (author), Billy Sunday
 Christopher Koch, Highways to a War
 Alex Miller (writer), The Sitters
 Mandy Sayer, The Cross
 Kathleen Stewart, Spilt Milk

Children's and young adult fiction 

 Isobelle Carmody, Ashling
 Brian Caswell, Deucalion
 Mem Fox, Wombat Divine
 Sonya Hartnett, Sleeping Dogs
 Garth Nix, Sabriel

Poetry 

 Jordie Albiston, Nervous Arcs
 Peter Bakowski, In The Human Night
 Philip Hodgins, Things Happen

Drama 

 Manny Aston, Fossils
 Joanna Murray-Smith, Honour
 Louis Nowra
 The Incorruptible
 Miss Bosnia
 David Williamson, Dead White Males

Science fiction and fantasy
 Gillian Rubinstein, Galax-Arena

Crime 
 John Dale (writer), Dark Angel
 Barry Maitland, The Malcontenta

Fantasy 
 David Brooks (author), The House of Balthus
 Jack Dann, The Memory Cathedral: A Secret History of Leonardo da Vinci
 Sara Douglass, Battleaxe
 Paul Kidd, Mus of Kerbridge
 Garth Nix, Sabriel
 Tony Shillitoe, The Last Wizard

Non-fiction 

 Timothy Conigrave, Holding the Man
 Garfield Barwick, A Radical Tory: Garfield Barwick's Reflections and Recollections
 Helen Garner, The First Stone

Awards and honours 

 Christopher Koch  "for service to Australian literature as a novelist"
 Alexander Stewart Cockburn  "for service to journalism and literature"
 Bryce Courtenay  "for service to advertising and marketing to the community and as an author"
 Mollie Gillen  "for service to genealogy and to Australian historical research"
 Paul Jennings  "for service to children's literature"
 Frances Margaret McGuire  "for service to the community and to literature, particularly through the State Library of South Australia"
 Walter Richard McVitty  "for service to the arts, particularly as educator and publisher of children's literature"
 Maurice Saxby  "for service to children's literature"
 Gavin Souter  "for service to Australian historical literature"
 Donald Wall  "for service to the recorded history of World war II, particularly the history of the 8th Division and the fate of prisoners of war at Sandakan, Northern Borneo"
 Madeleine Ruby Irene Brunato-Arthur  "for service to Australian writers, particularly through the Fellowship of Australian Writers in South Australia"

Deaths 
A list, ordered by date of death (and, if the date is either unspecified or repeated, ordered alphabetically by surname) of deaths in 1995 of Australian literary figures, authors of written works or literature-related individuals follows, including year of birth.

 13 January — Max Harris (poet), poet, critic, columnist, commentator, publisher and bookseller (born 1921)
 25 January — Margaret Senior, wildlife and children's illustrator and writer (born 1917 in London)
 20 March — Russell Braddon, writer of novels, biographies and TV scripts (born 1921)
 12 May — John Blight, poet (born 1913)
 26 June — John Jefferson Bray, lawyer, judge, academic, university administrator, Crown officer and published poet, (born 1912)
 17 July — Robert Close, novelist (born 1903)
 7 August — Harold Stewart, poet and oriental scholar (born 1916)
 14 August — Frances Margaret McGuire, writer, biochemist and philanthropist (born 1900)
 18 August — Philip Hodgins, poet (born 1959)
 4 December — Gwen Harwood, poet and librettist (born 1920)

See also 

 1995 in Australia
 1995 in literature
 1995 in poetry
 List of years in literature
 List of years in Australian literature

References 

1995 in Australia
Australian literature by year
20th-century Australian literature
1995 in literature